Phyllonorycter celtidis is a moth of the family Gracillariidae. It is known from Hokkaido and Kyushu, Japan.

The larvae feed as leaf miners on Celtis sinensis and Celtis jessoensis. The mine is ptychonomous and located on the lower surface of the leaves.

References

celtidis
Moths of Japan

Moths described in 1963
Taxa named by Tosio Kumata
Leaf miners